The Wee Man, also released as John Burns, is a 2013 British  gangster film directed by Ray Burdis and starring Martin Compston and John Hannah. It depicts the true life story of Scottish criminal Paul Ferris.

Due to the film's sympathetic portrayal of Ferris, Strathclyde Police refused to help the filmmakers make the film in Glasgow, Ferris's native city. The production team had to film in London instead due to the lack of support from the legal authorities in Glasgow.

Plot

In 1990, in his cell in Barlinnie Prison in Glasgow, Paul Ferris reflects on his childhood.

Young Paul's is told by his father to always beware of strangers, to always be loyal, and to be a "lion" and avoid following others actions. He witnesses the Banks brothers carry out an armed robbery, after which the Banks brothers harass Paul and kill his dog.

Teenage Paul is at a party when the Banks brothers crash it and wreck the house. Paul fetches a knife and returns to find two of the brothers sexually assaulting his girlfriend. He wounds them both and flees. His sister berates him as their older brother is serving life in prison for murder. Paul says he enjoyed the violence as he felt in control.

In prison, Paul arranges the killing of one of the Banks brothers. Upon his release Paul shuns a party thrown for him by Glasgow godfather Arthur Thompson, recalling that his father called Thompson "The Devil incarnate".

Paul argues with his wife Anne Marie over her fear of him being imprisoned or killed. In the pub Paul meets Arthur Thompson and his obnoxious, cocaine-addicted son Junior "Fat Boy" Thompson. Arthur praises Paul for the prison hit and gives him a job. Paul recalls as a child witnessing Arthur execute a man by shooting; and that he and his friends had taken money the from the dead man's wallet, money that the police confiscated when interviewing Paul about the murder.

Arthur confides to Paul that Junior has been scammed over £50,000 worth of drugs, and tasks Paul with retrieving the money. A car bomb kills Arthur's mother and hospitalises Arthur, who orders Paul and associate Tam "The Licensee" McGraw  to find the culprits. They are told that the Banks brothers were responsible. Paul is overjoyed that Anne Marie is pregnant.

Junior reveals to Arthur his jealous rivalry of Paul, sparked by Arthur's praising of Paul. During a home invasion massacre of the Banks family, the rivalry escalates when Paul stops Junior from killing two of the Banks women. Junior slashes a father's face in front of his children, shocking Paul due to Anne Marie's pregnancy.

Paul tells Anne Marie he has become what he had always hated and wishes to leave Glasgow because of the slashing incident, and that he wants to turn his back on crime. Junior and McGraw frame Paul for a hit attempt on Arthur. He serves eighteen months in prison for possessing a weapon, after which he meets his new son and Anne Marie says she no longer loves him.

Junior has Paul's father beaten up in an alley. Later Junior is brutally executed outside Arthur's home by a masked assailant, who is addressed as "Paul" by the getaway driver. Paul is arrested for Junior's murder. With Paul in jail, Arthur sanctions the murder of Paul's associates Jimmy, Johnny, Bobby and Joe, in collaboration with McGraw. Paul learns of McGraw's betrayal and threatens revenge when he is released. Paul is acquitted of Junior's murder. Final scenes show McGraw escaping assassination and boarding a flight to Tenerife, but despairing as he notices Tam and Bob behind him on the plane.

Closing text tells the fates of the real-life characters: Anne Marie and Paul separated; after many attempts on his life, Arthur "The Godfather" Thompson died of natural causes at 61; Junior Thompson's murder remains unsolved; Arthur's wife Rita never got over Arthur and Junior's deaths and died of a broken heart; Tam McGraw died of a heart attack aged 55 ; Bobby and Joe's murders remain unsolved; Paul Ferris still lives in Glasgow, and has turned his back on crime.

Cast
 Martin Compston as Paul Ferris
 Daniel Kerr as young Paul Ferris
 Denis Lawson as Willie Ferris
 Patrick Bergin as Arthur Thompson
 Laura McMonagle as Anne Marie
 John Hannah as Tam McGraw
 Clare Grogan as Jenny Ferris
 Stephen McCole as Junior Thompson
 Andrew Marley as Young Jimmy
 Alastair Thomson Mills as Wilson

References

External links
 
 

Films set in Glasgow
2013 films
British crime drama films
Films shot in London
2010s English-language films
2010s British films